Toreus is a monotypic genus of ceromid camel spiders, first described by William Frederick Purcell in 1903. Its single species, Toreus capensis is distributed in South Africa.

References 

Solifugae
Arachnid genera
Monotypic arachnid genera